Rise Pantheon Dreams is a compilation album by the British gothic metal band The Blood Divine. It features tracks from both the band's albums Mystica and Awaken, plus some previously unreleased material.

The title was originally intended to be used by Anathema for the album that became The Silent Enigma after the departure of vocalist Darren White.

Track listing
"Aureole" – 6:47
"Visions in Blue" – 4:31
"As Rapture Fades" – 3:24
"Revolt" – 1:31 (Previously unreleased)
"Wilderness" – 4:51
"Sensual Ecstasy" – 4:06
"Enchanted by Your Touch" – 1:56
"I Will Bleed" – 4:28
"The Passion Reigns" – 2:54
"Leaving Me Helpless" – 3:06
"Forever Belongs" – 1:52 (Previously unreleased)
"So Serene"  – 9:20
"Crazy Horses" –- 2:21 (Live Osmonds cover)
"Aureole" – 4:43 (Live)

Credits
Darren White - Vocals
Paul Allender - Guitars
Paul Ryan - Guitars
Benjamin Ryan - Keyboards
Steve Maloney - Bass
Was Sarginson - Drums, Percussion

The Blood Divine albums
Peaceville Records albums
2002 compilation albums